Li Jiao (born 15 January 1973) is a Chinese-born professional table tennis player who now represents the Netherlands. She resides in Heerhugowaard.

Notable matches
In the World Team Championship 2014 Quarter Final draw of Netherlands versus the host team Japan, Li, ranked 13th at the time, famously came from behind to defeat both the then World No. 10 Kasumi Ishikawa and World No. 25 Sayaka Hirano, in five sets. The match eventually finished 3–2 to Japan, with the final match of Britt Eerland (Netherlands) versus Kasumi Ishikawa (Japan) also ending in five sets.

Career highlights

Olympic Games
2008, Beijing, women's singles, last 16
2008, Beijing, team competition
2012, London, women's singles, last 8
2012, London, team competition, last 8
World Championships
2005, Shanghai, women's singles, quarter final
2005, Shanghai, mixed doubles, last 32
2006, Bremen, team competition, 14th
2007, Zagreb, women's singles, last 16
2007, Zagreb, mixed doubles, last 32
2008, Guangzhou, team competition, 7th
Pro Tour Grand Finals
2006, Hong Kong, women's singles, last 16
Pro Tour Meetings
2004, Warszawa, women's singles, quarter final
2004, Warszawa, women's doubles, winner 
2004, Aarhus, women's singles, semi final
2005, Santiago, women's singles, quarter final
2005, Fort Lauderdale, women's singles, quarter final
2006, St. Petersburg, women's singles, semi final
2006, Bayreuth, women's singles, quarter final
2006, Warszawa, women's singles, semi final
2008, Velenje, women's singles, winner 
2008, Velenje, women's doubles, runner-up 
2008, Santiago, women's doubles, semi final
European Games
2015, Baku, women's singles, winner 
2015, Baku, team competition, runner-up 
European Championships
2005, Aarhus, women's singles, semi final
2005, Aarhus, mixed doubles, quarter final
2007, Belgrade, women's singles, winner 
2008, St. Petersburg, team competition, winner 
European Top-12 Championships
2005, Rennes, 3rd 
2006, Copenhagen, 3rd 
2007, Arezzo, 1st 
2008, Frankfurt, 1st 
2010, Düsseldorf, 1st 
2011, Liège, 1st

References

 2008 Olympic profile
 ITTF Database

1973 births
Living people
Dutch female table tennis players
Chinese emigrants to the Netherlands
Table tennis players at the 2008 Summer Olympics
Table tennis players at the 2012 Summer Olympics
Table tennis players at the 2016 Summer Olympics
Olympic table tennis players of the Netherlands
Table tennis players from Qingdao
Table tennis players at the 2015 European Games
European Games gold medalists for the Netherlands
European Games silver medalists for the Netherlands
Chinese female table tennis players
Naturalised table tennis players
European Games medalists in table tennis